Hinton Battle (born November 29, 1956) is an American actor, singer, dancer, and dance instructor. He has won three Tony Awards, all in the category of Featured Actor in a Musical. He was the first to portray the Scarecrow in the stage version of The Wiz (a role assumed by Michael Jackson in the 1978 film adaptation).

Early life
Battle was born in Neubrücke, Hoppstädten, West Germany, part of the Baumholder Army Military Community, and raised in Washington, D.C. and New York City. His mother was a homemaker and his father a U.S. army officer. Battle's talent became apparent at the age of nine. After three years of studying ballet at the Jones-Haywood School of Ballet, he received a scholarship to The School of American Ballet where he studied until the age of fifteen under George Balanchine. On October 21, 1974, the new musical The Wiz opened at the Morris A. Mechanic Theatre in Baltimore, Maryland and then moved to Broadway's Majestic Theatre with a new cast on January 5, 1975. This is where Hinton made his Broadway debut starring as the Scarecrow.

Career
He has appeared in fifteen films and television programmes, including Quantum Leap, Dreamgirls, and Touched by an Angel. On Quantum Leap, he played Thames, the evil Observer from the future, in the final installment of the Evil Leaper trilogy of episodes.
 
Battle played the role of the Cat in the first U.S. pilot for science-fiction sitcom Red Dwarf, based on the British show of the same name. Notably, he guest starred as Sweet the jazz demon, in "Once More, with Feeling", Buffy The Vampire Slayer'''s musical episode in which his spell forces the characters to sing their biggest secrets and fears.

Hinton's other Broadway starring roles include Dancin', Dreamgirls, Sophisticated Ladies for which he won his first Tony Award, Chicago (Billy Flynn), and Ragtime (Coalhouse Walker Jr.), which garnered rave reviews from the Chicago press and earned him an Ira Aldridge Award. His role in The Tap Dance Kid also earned Hinton a second Tony Award, the NAACP Award and the Fred Astaire Award, and Miss Saigon for which he won his third Tony Award.

Hinton's long list of television credits include: Shine, his one-man show presented at the HBO Aspen Comedy Arts Festival; The Kennedy Center's 25th Anniversary; These Old Broads, co-starring Shirley MacLaine, Joan Collins, Debbie Reynolds and Elizabeth Taylor; and ABC/Disney's Child Star: The Shirley Temple Story where Hinton served as a choreographer and co-star playing Bill ‘Bojangles’ Robinson.

As a choreographer, Hinton's work has been seen on the musical episode of Buffy the Vampire Slayer, "Once More, with Feeling", These Old Broads, Foreign Student (with Charles Dutton), The Golden Globe Awards, Dance in America; the sitcoms Fired Up, Sister Sister, The Trouble with Normal, and The Boys. Hinton has choreographed promos for Warner Brothers, commercials for Coca-Cola, Chicago The Millie and New York Top Appliances. He served as Associate Choreographer on the 65th and 66th Annual Academy Awards with Debbie Allen.

Off-Broadway Hinton has served as co-director and choreographer for Evil Dead The Musical. Having finished choreographing the movie musical Idlewild, he joined with Wynton Marsalis for The Buddy Bolden Story, a feature film about the untold story of the man who created jazz in America. He then directed the stage musical Respect, a musical journey of women from the 1900s – 2007. Hinton's most recent creation, a dance form called Swop that combines swing and hip-hop, was performed on the highly rated Dancing with the Stars in 2006. In 2014, Hinton starred in the off-Broadway production Cindy: The Musical.

Music
In addition to his prolific dancing career, Battle briefly drifted into singing in the mid-1980s. His song "Think We're Gonna Make It" was featured on the soundtrack to the 1986 movie Playing for Keeps, and he released his lone solo album, Untapped, that same year.

References

 External links 
 
 
 
 
Hinton Battle Theatre Laboratory
Chats with Hinton (“Idlewild,” “Dreamgirls”) Battle and Boyd (“Angela’s Eyes”) Gaines, Playbill'' interview, July 2006
TonyAwards.com Interview with Hinton Battle

1956 births
Living people
20th-century American male actors
20th-century American singers
African-American choreographers
African-American male actors
African-American male dancers
African-American male singers
American choreographers
American male dancers
American male film actors
American male musical theatre actors
American male singers
American male stage actors
American male television actors
American tap dancers
Dance teachers
German emigrants to the United States
Male actors from New York City
Male actors from Washington, D.C.
People from Kusel (district)
Singers from New York City
Singers from Washington, D.C.
Tony Award winners